Helgerud is a Norwegian surname. Notable people with the surname include:

Albert Helgerud (1876–1954), Norwegian rifle shooter 
Cato Helgerud (1921–1997), Norwegian bandy player
Frode Helgerud (born 1950), Norwegian businessman and politician

Norwegian-language surnames